Dazhigu Subdistrict is a subdistrict situated in the southwest edge of Hedong District, Tianjin. it borders Tangjiakou and Shanghang Road Subdistricts in the northeast, Zhongshanmen and Fumin Road Subdistricts in the southeast, as well as Guajiasi and Xiawafang Subdistricts in the south. In 2010, it had a census population of 88,860.

Its name is taken from Zhigu, the name of Tianjin during the Yuan dynasty.

History

Administrative divisions 
By 2021, Dazhigu Subdistrict was subdivided into these 14 communities:

References 

Township-level divisions of Tianjin
Hedong District, Tianjin